Christ in the House of Martha and Mary (Dutch: Christus in het huis van Martha en Maria) is a painting finished in 1655 by the Dutch Golden Age painter Johannes Vermeer. It is now in the Scottish National Gallery in Edinburgh. It is the largest painting by Vermeer and one of the very few with an overt religious motive. The story of Christ visiting the household of the two sisters Mary and Martha goes back to the New Testament. The work has also been called Christ in the House of Mary and Martha (reversing the last two names).

Painting materials
The pigment analysis of this painting reveals the use of the pigments of the baroque period such as madder lake, yellow ochre, vermilion and lead white. Vermeer did not paint the robe of Christ with his usual blue pigment of choice ultramarine (see for example The Milkmaid) but with a mixture of smalt, indigo and lead white.

See also
 Martha
 Mary of Bethany
 List of paintings by Johannes Vermeer
 Dutch Golden Age painting

References

Further reading

External links
 National Galleries of Scotland web page on the painting
 Essential Vermeer website pages on the painting
 Vermeercentrum, housed at the site of the former St. Lucas Guild in Delft.
 Vermeer and The Delft School, a full text exhibition catalog from The Metropolitan Museum of Art, which contains material on the painting (see index)
 The Milkmaid by Johannes Vermeer, exhibition catalog fully online as PDF from The Metropolitan Museum of Art, which contains material on the painting
 Johannes Vermeer, Christ in the House of Martha and Mary, Colourlex

Religious paintings by Johannes Vermeer
1655 paintings
Paintings in the National Galleries of Scotland
Paintings depicting Jesus